This is a list of American television-related events in 1975.

Events

Other notable events  
 In November, Sony Corporation introduces the Betamax video recorder in the United States, which comes in a teakwood console alongside a  color television set. It sold for $2,495.
NBC retires the Laramie Peacock logo, which was used at the start of every color program on the network. The network later retires the NBC snake logo, used for promos and network identifications, in December.

Programs
 signifies that this show has a related event in the Events section above.

ABC
American Bandstand (1952–1989)
The Edge of Night (1956–1984)
General Hospital (1963–present)
One Life to Live (1968–2012)
All My Children (1970–2011)
Monday Night Football (1970–present)
Schoolhouse Rock! (1973–1996)
The Six Million Dollar Man (1973–1978)
Happy Days (1974–1984)
Baretta (1975–1978)
Barney Miller (1975–1982)
Good Morning America (1975–present)
Ryan's Hope (1975–1989)
Tom and Jerry (1965–1972, 1975–1977, 1980–1982)
Welcome Back, Kotter (1975–1979)
Charlie's Angels (1976–1981)
CBS
Love of Life (1951–1980)
Search for Tomorrow (1951–1986)
The Guiding Light (1952–2009)
Face the Nation (1954–present)
Captain Kangaroo (1955–1984)
As the World Turns (1956–2010)
The Carol Burnett Show (1967–1978)
60 Minutes (1968–present)
Hawaii Five-O (1968–1980)
The Mary Tyler Moore Show (1970–1977)
All in the Family (1971–1979)
Cannon (1971–1976)
The Bob Newhart Show (1972–1978)
Fat Albert and the Cosby Kids (1972–1984)
M*A*S*H (1972–1983)
Maude (1972–1978)
The Price Is Right (1972–present)
The Waltons (1972–1981)
Barnaby Jones (1973–1980)
Kojak (1973–1978, 2005)
Match Game '75 (1962–1969, 1973–1984, 1990–1991, 1998–1999, 2016–2021)
The Young and the Restless (1973–present)
Good Times (1974–1979)
Rhoda (1974–1978)
Tattletales (1974–1978, 1982–1984)
One Day at a Time (1975–1984)
The Jeffersons (1975-1985)
Wheel of Fortune (1975–present)
NBC
Meet the Press (1947–present)
The Today Show (1952–present)
The Tonight Show Starring Johnny Carson (1962–1992)
The Doctors (1963–1982)
Another World (1964–1999)
Days of Our Lives (1965–present)
Hollywood Squares (1966–1980)
Kimba the White Lion (1966–1967) reruns.
Adam-12 (1968–1975) 
The Wonderful World of Disney (1969–1979)
McCloud (1970–1977)
Somerset (1970–1976) 
Columbo (1971–1978)
McMillan & Wife (1971–1977)
Emergency! (1972–1977)
The Midnight Special (TV series) (1972–1981) 
Sanford and Son (1972–1977)
The Tomorrow Show (1973–1982)
Celebrity Sweepstakes (1974–1976) 
Chico and the Man (1974–1978)
Dean Martin Celebrity Roast (1974–1984)
High Rollers (1974–1976, 1978–1980) 
Little House on the Prairie (1974–1983)
Police Woman (1974–1978)
The Rockford Files (1974–1980)
Saturday Night Live (1975–present)
PBS
Sesame Street (1969–present)
Evening at Pops (1970–2005) 
Dave Allen at Large (1971–1979)
The Electric Company (1971–1977)
Masterpiece Theatre (1971–present)
Bill Moyers Journal (1972-1976-; 1979–1981; 2007–2010)
Great Performances (1972–present) 
Zoom (1972–1978)
Nova (1974–present)
In syndication
Candid Camera (1948–present)
Death Valley Days (1952–1975)
Truth or Consequences (1950–1988)
The Lawrence Welk Show (1955–1982)
The Mike Douglas Show (1961–1981)
Hee Haw (1969–1993)
Soul Train (1971–2006)
Dinah! (1974–1980)

Debuting this year

Ending this year

Notes

Changing networks

Television specials
April 25 – Alice Cooper: The Nightmare (ABC)

Networks and services

Network launches

Television stations

Sign-ons

Network affiliation changes

Station closures

Births

Deaths

See also 
1975 in television 
1975 in film 
List of American films of 1975
1974-75 United States network television schedule 
1975-76 United States network television schedule 
Family Viewing Hour

References

External links 
List of 1975 American television series at IMDb